Charles Bryan Martyn (27 December 1930 – 9 June 2002) was an Australian rules footballer who played with North Melbourne in the VFL during the 1950s.

Martyn won the 1957 Syd Barker Medal for being judged North Melbourne's best and fairest player, an award that his son Mick would later win twice.

He died from cancer on 9 June 2002, aged 71. Just days prior to his death, his son Mick got special AFL approval to wear the guernsey number 30 in his father's honour, which was the number Bryan wore for the latter half of his career. Mick said, "I didn't want to do it (wear Bryan's number) after he died. It was the greatest night of my life. It was better than winning a premiership. I wore two jumpers because I wanted to send one down with him, down the grave."

References

External links

1930 births
2002 deaths
Australian rules footballers from Victoria (Australia)
North Melbourne Football Club players
Syd Barker Medal winners
Deaths from cancer in Victoria (Australia)